The 2014 IAAF World Relays were held in May 2014 in Nassau, Bahamas. The event was the first edition of the IAAF World Relays. There were five events for each gender. In men's and women's 4 x 100 metres and 4 x 400 metres, the event served as a qualification event for the 2015 World Championships in Athletics.

Schedule

Results

Men

Women

Medal table

Team standings

Teams scored for every place in the top 8 with 8 points awarded for the first place, 7 for second, etc. The United States team won the overall classification and was awarded the Golden Baton. No individual medals were awarded although presentations of the first three teams in each event did take place.

Qualification for 2015 World Championships
The top eight-finishers in 4x100 and 4x400 events would qualify for the 2015 World Championships in Beijing. If a team was disqualified, the top team in the B-final would qualify.

The following countries qualified teams for all four relays in 2015. :

 
 
 

All qualifiers :

Participating nations
43 nations took part in the competition.

 (30)
 (28)
 (5)
 (6)
 (5)
 (4)
 (20)
 (5)
 (20)
 (5)
 (10)
 (8)
 (10)
 (10)
 (28)
 (17)
 (24)
 (5)
 (38)
 (17)
 (28)
 (9)
 (6)
 (21)
 (5)
 (25)
 (9)
 (5)
 (6)
 (14)
 (5)
 (6)
 (5)
 (5)
 (15)
 (7)
 (23)
 (5)
 (5)
 (5)
 (56)
 (5)
 (11)

References

External links
 IAAF World Relays – IAAF.org
 Full results
 Official IAAF channel with videos from the competition

 
World Athletics Relays
IAAF World Relays
World Relays
International athletics competitions hosted by the Bahamas
IAAF World Relays